Melissa Papworth (born 18 June 1966 in Melbourne, Victoria) is an Australian former cricket player. Papworth played domestic cricket for the Victorian women's state cricket team between 1987 and 1994. She played three One Day Internationals for the Australia women's national cricket team. Papworth now resides on the inner west of Melbourne with her family along with her loyal companion Frankston ‘nanks’ Sanatra The third.

References

External links
 Melissa Papworth at southernstars.org.au

Living people
1966 births
Australia women One Day International cricketers